"Sorry Not Sorry" is the ninth episode of the thirty-second season of the American animated television series The Simpsons, and the 693rd episode overall. It aired in the United States on Fox on December 6, 2020. The episode was directed by Rob Oliver and written by Nell Scovell. This was Scovell's second Simpsons episode as writer, after a hiatus of almost 30 years since her season 2 episode "One Fish, Two Fish, Blowfish, Blue Fish".

Plot 
Lisa, excited to share her "Who Inspires You?" diorama project with the class, creates a rap about her topic that exceeds the time limit set by Miss Hoover for the entire class. When Hoover (who is stuck on the floor due to her combination of back pain and laziness) uses an automatic-messaging app to give everyone in the class (even Ralph) the same B- grade, Lisa calls her a hack and refuses to apologize. She is sent to detention, where the bullies are mean to her until Bart shoos them off with a stink bomb and suggests that Lisa tell Hoover she is "soggy" instead of "sorry". Lisa tries it, but Hoover sees through her trick and becomes mad at her.

Groundskeeper Willie suggests that Lisa try to say "sorry". Lisa tries, but she just cannot do it, so she decides to follow Hoover home to see if she can empathize with this unlikable, careless person. After riding on a multitude of run-down or dirty vehicles to follow her, and even riding down a hill on a cardboard box (something Hoover does to not hurt her back), Lisa sees what Hoover's lonely life is like and takes pity on her. She buys Hoover a new chair with a footrest, and says that she is sorry. Hoover is reluctant to accept her apology until she realizes that the chair has a massage function. When Lisa politely but firmly states that she put a lot of effort into making amends and that "it's not easy for a kid to do that", Miss Hoover decides to adjust Lisa's diorama grade to a B+. Lisa's happy with this, until Ralph also receives a requested B+, leading Lisa to exclaim "D'oh!"

Production 
On 2020, Fox released seven promotional pictures from the episode. "Sorry Not Sorry" was released on December 6, 2020. The episode was directed by Rob Oliver and written by Nell Scovell, and is the first episode to have been written by Scovell in 30 years.

Reception 
The episode was well received on Den of Geek and Bubbleblabber.

References

External links 

2020 American television episodes
The Simpsons (season 32) episodes
Television episodes written by Nell Scovell